Dan Vesterby Thomassen (born 24 March 1981) is a Danish former professional footballer and current coach. He has played for Danish Superliga side AGF Aarhus, Norwegian side Vålerenga and Danish champions Copenhagen.

He is the current head coach of  club Vicenza.

Playing career
Thomassen came to FCK from Calcio Padova where he played in five years. In his youth years he played in AGF.

He signed for Vålerenga IF on July 1, 2007.

Since he signed with AGF in 2008, he has been dealing with many injuries, which meant that he missed some vital matches for his team.

He moved back to Italy in 2011, and retired in 2018.

Coaching career
After retiring from active football, Thomassen took on a career as a youth coach, joining Vicenza, and being appointed in charge of the Under-19 team in 2022.

On 16 March 2023, following the dismissal of Francesco Modesto, he was promoted head coach of Vicenza in the Serie C league for the remainder of the season.

Honours
Copenhagen
2005–06, 2006–07: Champions

Padova
 2000–01 Serie C2: Champions
 2014–15 Serie D: Champions

References

External links

Danish national team profile 
Official Danish Superliga stats

1981 births
Living people
Danish men's footballers
Denmark under-21 international footballers
Denmark youth international footballers
Fuglebakken KFUM players
Aarhus Gymnastikforening players
Calcio Padova players
F.C. Copenhagen players
Vålerenga Fotball players
Ravenna F.C. players
U.S. Triestina Calcio 1918 players
Danish Superliga players
Eliteserien players
Serie C players
Serie D players
Danish expatriate men's footballers
Expatriate footballers in Italy
Expatriate footballers in Norway
Footballers from Aarhus
Association football defenders
Association football central defenders
Abano Calcio players
A.S.D. Albignasego Calcio players
Serie C managers
Danish football managers
L.R. Vicenza managers